The Canadian Forces School of Music, CFSM (French language: École de musique des Forces canadiennes, EMFC) was an educational institution that supported the music branch and all Canadian military bands in the Canadian Forces. It was created in 1954 in Esquimalt, British Columbia for musicians of the Royal Canadian Navy, with the school being the Canadian equivalent of the United States Armed Forces School of Music and the Royal Military School of Music. In 1961, the school was expanded and rebranded to include musicians from the Canadian Army and the Royal Canadian Air Force, and by the time of the Unification of the Canadian Armed Forces in February 1968, the school had officially been renamed to the CFSM. For its entire existence, the CFSM was located at CFB Borden in Ontario and offered enrolled students with a two-year educational program until it was disestablished in 1991. Enrollment varied with the requirement for musicians. The school also gave a one-year program to CF musicians with experience in the music branch who wish to serve in leadership positions in CF bands. Personnel of the Regular Force who wish to be qualified to as a pipe major have to attend a year long course at the CFSM in order be appointed to the post.

A notable instructor at the EMFC includes James Gayfer who was the director of the Band of the Canadian Guards from 1953-1961. CF's musical training establishment of today is known as the Logistics Training Centre Music Division of the Royal Canadian Logistics Service.

Commandants
The following have served as commandants of the school:

Lieutenant Commander H.G. Cuthbert (1954-1956) 
Lieutenant Commander Stanley Sunderland (1956-1966)
Lieutenant Colonel Clifford Hunt (1966-1968)
Lieutenant Colonel Edmund T. Jones (1968-1975)
Lieutenant Colonel Tom Milner (1975-1980)
Lieutenant Colonel Charles-Auguste Villeneuve (1980-1984)
Commander George Morrison (1984-1985)
Lieutenant Commander Ben Templaars (1985-1987) 
Major Jean-Pierre Montminy (1987-1990) 
Major William T. Wornes (since 1990)

Notable alumni
Jack Kopstein, graduated in 1971 and went on to later serve as assistant director of the Central Band of the Canadian Armed Forces.
Kenneth Killingbeck, director of the Royal Canadian Regiment Band in the late 1980s and early 1990s.
Bobby Herriot, Scottish-Canadian musicians who served in the Band of the Blues and Royals and The Band of the 7th Toronto Regiment, RCA.

See also
 Canadian military bands
 Music Branch (Canadian Forces)
 Authorized marches of the Canadian Armed Forces
 Military band

References

Military bands of Canada
Military academies of Canada
Performing arts education in Canada
Music schools in Canada
1954 establishments in Canada
Vancouver Island